is a train station on the Hankyu Senri Line and Osaka Monorail located in Suita, Osaka, Japan.

Lines
Hankyu Senri Line (Station Number: HK94)
Osaka Monorail Main Line (Station Number: 16)

Layout
The Hankyu and Osaka Monorail stations are 200 meters away.

Hankyu Senri Line
There are two side platforms and two tracks on the ground level. Each platform has its own ticket gate.

Osaka Monorail Main Line
There are an island platform and two tracks elevated on the third floor. The ticket gate is on the second floor.

History

Yamada Station on the Hankyu Senri Line opened on November 23, 1973 between the existing Minami-Senri Station and Kita-Senri Station. Approximately 300 meters north of the Hankyu station was temporary Expo West Gate Station which served Expo '70 in 1970.

The Osaka Monorail station opened on June 1, 1990 when the line started operation.

Stations next to Yamada

External links
 Yamada Station from Hankyu Railway website
 Yamada Station from Osaka-Monorail website

References

Railway stations in Japan opened in 1973
Railway stations in Osaka Prefecture